Emilio Lara may refer to:
 Emilio Lara (weightlifter)
 Emilio Lara (footballer)